Laura Iglesias Romero was a Spanish chemist who was a pioneer in the use of atomic spectroscopy in the study of the movements of stars.

Biography 

Born in Benavente,  Zamora in 1928, Iglesias Romero was a scientific researcher at the Consejo Superior de Investigaciones Científicas (CSIC). In 1956 she received a grant from CSIC to study at the Princeton University where she worked with Allen Shenstone (at the time Dean of the Physics faculty). Following this, she moved to Washington in order to work at the National Bureau of Standards during the 1960s.

After refusing various offers, she returned to Spain to CSIC. After joining the Instituto de Óptica Daza de Valdés, she dedicated her studies to obtaining and observing spectra of transition metal elements, which would go on to be of particular interest in the field of astrophysics. These data were used to understand the movements of stars and other heavy elements in the periodic system.

In 2008, the 'Premio de Divulgación Científica' award for scientific communication, convened by the Valladolid Science Museum Foundation and the Castilla y León government, was named after her.

References 

1928 births
Spanish chemists
Spanish physicists
20th-century women scientists
Spanish women chemists
Living people